Lieutenant General Mertil Börje Melin (born 17 July 1945) is a retired Swedish Army officer. Melin started his military career as a ranger at Norrland's Dragoons (K 4) in Umeå and after several position and courses he became Chief of Army Command (19961998) and military commander of the Northern Military District (19982000) in Boden. After some time at the European Union Military Committee in Brussels he finished his career as the Crown Equerry of the Royal Court of Sweden.

Early life
Melin was born on 17 July 1945 in Stånga, Sweden, the son of Sven Erik Olof Melin (1909–1987) and Dagny Gertrud Emilia Ulmstedt (1913–2004). His interest in horses started in the mid-1950s at the farm in Stånga where his neighbor had three Ardennais and a Gotland pony. He left Gotland and the farm in Stånga in 1963 to do his military conscription at the cavalry regiment Norrland Dragoons (K 4) in Umeå. Melin interest in horses came in handy there too as the regiment had 400 horses in its stable. He then attended the Swedish Armed Forces School for Secondary Education from which he graduated in 1967.

Career
He graduated from the Military Academy Karlberg in 1968 and was commissioned as an officer with the rank of second lieutenant the same year. Melin served in Norrland Dragoons (K 4) in Umeå from 1968 to 1979. Melin attended the Infantry and Cavalry Officer School from 1970 to 1971 and was promoted to captain in 1972. He completed Ranger School at Fort Benning in Georgia in 1977, the first Swedish officer to do that. After that he did the Higher Staff Course at the Military Academy Karlberg from 1977 to 1979. Melin was a major in the Defence Staff in 1979 and the General Staff Corps in 1981 and was section head at Gotland Military Command from 1982 to 1987. He was also adjutant of His Majesty the King from 1980 to 1988.

Melin was appointed lieutenant colonel in 1984 and was the battalion commander at Norrland Dragoon Regiment (K 4) from 1987 to 1989. He was promoted to colonel and appointed commander of Norrland Dragoon Regiment (K 4) 1 July 1989. At the age of 43, he was Sweden's youngest colonel and regimental commander. On 4 June 1992, Melin was promoted to senior colonel, and assumed the position as head of operation at the Northern Military District (Milo N) in Boden, serving until 1995. Melin was promoted to major general and was deputy Chief of Army Command at Swedish Armed Forces Headquarters from 1995 to 1996. On 1 April 1996, Melin was promoted to lieutenant general and was appointed Chief of Army Command. He was after that military commander of the Northern Military District from 1998 to 2000 and the Sweden's member of the European Union Military Committee and the NATO military committee for partner countries.

He was the Crown Equerry of the Royal Court of Sweden from 2003 to 2015.

Membership
Melin is a member of the Royal Swedish Academy of War Sciences since 1995 and a board member of the Association for the Mounted Guard (Föreningen för den Beridna Högvakten). He is also an honorary member of the Cavalry and Ranger Officers Association (Kavalleri- och Jägarbefälsföreningen).

Personal life
In 1968, Melin married Gurli Margaretha Åberg (born 1944 in Umeå), the daughter of Stig and Gurli Åberg. He is the father of Stig Magnus (born 1969 in Umeå) and Anna Margareta (born 1976 in Umeå).

Dates of rank
1968 – Second lieutenant
19?? – Lieutenant
1972 – Captain
1979 – Major
1984 – Lieutenant colonel
1 July 1989 – Colonel
4 June 1992 – Senior colonel
15 October 1995 – Major general
1 April 1996 – Lieutenant general

Awards and decorations

Swedish
   12th size gold medal worn around the neck on a chain of gold (silver-gilt)
   H. M. The King's Medal, 12th size gold (silver-gilt) medal worn around the neck on the Order of the Seraphim ribbon (2009)
   H. M. The King's Medal, 8th size gold (silver-gilt) medal worn on the chest suspended by the Order of the Seraphim ribbon (1987)
   King Carl XVI Gustaf's Jubilee Commemorative Medal II (23 August 2013)
   Home Guard Medal of Merit in Gold
 etc

Foreign
   Commander 1st Class of the Order of the White Rose of Finland
   2nd  Class of the Order of the Cross of the Eagle (12 January 2011)
  Order of Merit of the Federal Republic of Germany
 etc

References

External links

Film clip from a talk by Mertil Melin (1996) 

1945 births
Living people
Swedish Army lieutenant generals
Chiefs of Army (Sweden)
People from Gotland
Members of the Royal Swedish Academy of War Sciences
Recipients of the Order of Merit of the Federal Republic of Germany